Kevin Nemia (born 31 July 1989) is a New Caledonian footballer who plays for AS Magenta.

International career

International goals
Scores and results list New Caledonia's goal tally first.

References

External links 
 

1989 births
Living people
New Caledonian footballers
AS Magenta players
New Caledonia international footballers
Association football forwards
2016 OFC Nations Cup players